Live at Slane Castle, Ireland is a concert film by Canadian rocker Bryan Adams. It was filmed on 26 August 2000  at Slane Castle in County Meath, Ireland.

The video recorded during the Slane Festival in which Bryan Adams is the headliner. During the day they performed as opening artists: Macy Gray, Muse, Eagle-Eye Cherry, Dara, Screaming Orphans, Melanie C and
Moby.

The show, despite uncertain weather forecasts, was for a mixture of sun and showers, had 65,000 fans in attendance.

Track listing
"Back to You" (Adams, Kennedy)
"18 til I Die (Adams, Lange)
"Can't Stop This Thing We Started" (Adams, Lange)
"Summer of '69" (Adams, Vallance)
"It's Only Love" (Adams, Vallance)
"(Everything I Do) I Do It for You" (Adams, Lange, Kamen)
"Cuts Like a Knife" (Adams, Vallance)
"When You're Gone" duet with Melanie C (Adams, Kennedy)
"She's Only Happy When She's Dancin'" (Adams, Vallance)
"I'm Ready" (Adams, Vallance)
"Heaven" (Adams, Vallance)
"Blues Jam" (If Ya Wanna Be Bad - Ya Gotta Be Good/Let's Make a Night to Remember) (Adams, Lange)
"The Only Thing That Looks Good on Me Is You" (Adams, Lange)
"Don't Give Up" (Adams, Chicane, Hedges)
"Cloud Number Nine" (Adams, Martin, Peters)
"Run to You" (Adams, Vallance)
"The Best of Me" (Adams, Lange)
"Please Forgive Me" (Adams, Lange)

Bonus tracks
"Have You Ever Really Loved a Woman?" 	(Adams, Lange, Kamen) 
"Into The Fire" (Adams, Vallance) 
"Before the Night Is Over" (Adams, Martin)

Personnel
Bryan Adams —  bass, vocals 
Mickey Curry — drums, backing vocals 
Keith Scott — guitar, backing vocals

Guest Appearance
Melanie C — vocals in "When You're Gone"
Davy Spillane —  performer low whistle in "I'm Ready" and "Heaven"
Chicane —  performer keyboards and DJ Mix in "Don't Give Up" and "Cloud Number Nine"

External staff
Hamish Hamilton —  film director  
Jim Parsons —  film producer
Bob Clearmountain — engineer, mixed
Büro Dirk Rodolph — artwork
Mick Hutson — photography 
Bryan Adams — photography

Certifications

References

Bryan Adams albums
2001 video albums
2001 live albums
Live video albums
Films directed by Hamish Hamilton (director)